International University of Chabahar is located in the Chabahar Free Trade-Industrial Zone, in the city of Chabahar, part of Sistan and Baluchestan Province in Iran.

Affiliations

The institute offers degrees in collaboration with the University of London and Iran University of Science and Technology. Numerous undergraduate courses are offered as external programmes by several affiliates of the University of London.

Overview of undergraduate courses

Undergraduate degrees in Information Systems and Management, Economics and Management, Management, Banking and Finance, Business, Economics and Development are offered by the London School of Economics.

Undergraduate degrees in Computing and Information Systems are offered by Goldsmiths, University of London.

Undergraduate degrees in Business Administration are offered by Royal Holloway, University of London.

Undergraduate degrees in Civil Engineering and Architecture, are offered by Iran University of Science and Technology.

Overview of Postgraduate courses 
Int'l University of Chabahar offers postgraduates courses in Business Management (Marketing), Executive Management, Information Technology (IT), Spatial Planning and Structural Engineering.

Student participation

The majority of students are enrolled in civil engineering and architecture programmes, taught and examined in Persian. Student participation in the external degrees is strongest in Computing and Information Systems programme, where the language of instruction and examination is English.

Makoran Coasts International Scholarship
In line with executing its support policies and pursuant to the Bylaws of the Iranian Ministry of Science, Research and Technology (MSRT), International University of Chabahar (hereinafter referred to as “the University”) offers scholarships (covering tuition fees and/or welfare costs) and grants to applicants for studying at the University.

This scholarship is able for Afghanistan, Tajikistan, Pakistan, Kazakhstan, India, Oman, China.

Programs

Bachelor's degree
Civil Engineering
Mineral Engineering
Computer Science
Banking Management
Commercial Management
Industrial Management
English Language and Literature
Educational Sciences
Law
Economics
Architectural Engineering

Master's degree
Information Technology with a Concentration on E-commerce
Civil Engineering with a Concentration on Construction Management
Civil Engineering with a Concentration on Structures
Educational Technology Engineering
Financial Management
Commercial Management
Business Management
International Commercial and Business Law
Geography and Land Use Planning

See also
Higher education in Iran
Chabahar Free Trade-Industrial Zone

References

External links
 International University of Chabahar

Universities in Iran
International universities
Educational institutions established in 2002
Education in Sistan and Baluchestan Province
2002 establishments in Iran
Buildings and structures in Sistan and Baluchestan Province